Ryan Clancy (born 1977) is an American teacher, business owner, and politician from Milwaukee, Wisconsin. He is a member of the Wisconsin State Assembly, representing Wisconsin's 19th Assembly district since January 2023. He is also a member of the Milwaukee County board of supervisors. He is a member of the Democratic Party ticket and the Democratic Socialists of America.

Early life and career
Ryan Clancy graduated from Nicolet High School in Glendale, Wisconsin, in 1995.  While in high school, he organized a student-run alternative newspaper which ran afoul of the school administration and nearly got him expelled.  His case came to the attention of the American Civil Liberties Union, which represented his interests and saved him from expulsion.  He was also then awarded Young Civil Libertarian of the Year.

He earned his bachelor's degree in English from Beloit College, and joined the Peace Corps.  He was sent to work as an English teacher in a remote rural area of the Philippines.  After his term in the Peace Corps, he returned to Milwaukee County.  In 2003, he traveled to Iraq to protest the impending invasion.  After returning from Iraq, the federal Office of Foreign Assets Control issued him a $10,000 fine, but he was again defended by the ACLU.  While on trial for his trip to Iraq, he worked on peace and reconciliation with groups of American and Iraqi youth.  He subsequently earned his master's degree from California State University, Dominguez Hills, and did field work in Israel and the Palestinian Territories.

During these years, he also taught as a substitute teacher in the Milwaukee Public Schools and became an organizer with the Milwaukee Teachers' Education Association.  In 2014, he and his wife started Bounce Milwaukee, a community recreational complex and restaurant.  Through this business ownership, he was a founder of the Progressive Restaurant and Activists of Wisconsin Network, which advocates for higher wages and better working conditions in the food service industry.

He continued to volunteer with activist causes through these years, participating in the Dakota Access Pipeline protests in North Dakota and several immigrant rights protests in Racine and Milwaukee, and was active in the Black Lives Matter protests—after which he filed a lawsuit against the city and county of Milwaukee for violating his rights.  He has also been a long-time volunteer for disaster-relief organizations, traveling widely.

Political career
After a vacancy occurred in his county board district, Clancy started a campaign for Milwaukee County board of supervisors in 2020.  He narrowly defeated his opponent in the Spring general election, and became the first socialist on the county board since 1956.  He was re-elected in 2022.

Shortly after the 2022 Spring election, incumbent state representative Jonathan Brostoff announced he would run for Milwaukee city council rather than seeking re-election to the State Assembly.  A few weeks later, Clancy announced his candidacy for the Democratic nomination in the heavily Democratic district, which spans nearly all of Milwaukee's lakefront.  Surprisingly, no other candidates entered the race, and Clancy was unopposed in the primary and general election.  He is scheduled to take office in the Assembly in January 2023.

Personal life and family
Ryan Clancy lives with his wife Becky and their five children in the Bay View neighborhood of Milwaukee.  They are co-owners of the Bounce Milwaukee complex.

Electoral history

Milwaukee county board (2020, 2022)

| colspan="6" style="text-align:center;background-color: #e9e9e9;"| Nonpartisan Primary, February 18, 2020 (top two)

| colspan="6" style="text-align:center;background-color: #e9e9e9;"| General Election, April 7, 2020

| colspan="6" style="text-align:center;background-color: #e9e9e9;"| General Election, April 5, 2022

Wisconsin Assembly (2022)

| colspan="6" style="text-align:center;background-color: #e9e9e9;"| General Election, November 8, 2022

References

External links
 Campaign website
 Official (county) website
 Bounce Milwaukee
 
 Ryan Clancy at Wisconsin Vote

1977 births
Living people
Beloit College alumni
Democratic Party members of the Wisconsin State Assembly
Politicians from Milwaukee
County supervisors in Wisconsin
American democratic socialists
21st-century American politicians